The MLS is Back Tournament took place during the 2020 Major League Soccer season to mark the league's return to action after being suspended as a result of the COVID-19 pandemic. Of the 26 Major League Soccer teams, 24 participated in the tournament; FC Dallas and Nashville SC withdrew after several of their players tested positive for COVID-19 just before their first matches. The tournament was held behind closed doors from July 8 to August 11, 2020, at the ESPN Wide World of Sports Complex in the Walt Disney World Resort in Bay Lake, Florida, near Orlando. The tournament featured a group stage, which was counted toward the 2020 MLS regular season standings, followed by knockout rounds. The tournament champion, Portland Timbers, qualified for the 2021 CONCACAF Champions League, and the 2020 season resumed upon completion of the tournament.

Background

The 2020 Major League Soccer season, the 25th season of the top professional soccer league in the United States and Canada, began on February 29, 2020. On March 12, the season was suspended due to the COVID-19 pandemic in North America, following the cancellation of several matches. At the time of the cancellation, all 26 teams had played two league matches. On March 19, the suspension was extended until May 10, and on April 17, was again extended to June 8. On May 1, the league announced that players were allowed to resume individual outdoor training at MLS facilities on May 6. The COVID-19 pandemic is the first interruption of regular season play since the 2001 season, in which many late regular season games were cancelled due to the September 11 attacks.

Plans to resume the MLS season at a single venue were made by the league in April and May. Among the locations considered were Las Vegas, Vancouver, Los Angeles, and Orlando. The name, "MLS is Back", was reused from a marketing slogan used prior to the season.

Format
The tournament was announced by Major League Soccer on June 10, 2020. Teams could begin traveling to Florida on June 24, though they could arrive no later than seven days prior to their first match. The tournament was planned to feature 54 matches (later reduced to 51 following the withdrawal of FC Dallas) played on 26 days, all taking place behind closed doors without spectators at the ESPN Wide World of Sports Complex in Bay Lake, Florida.

The 26 teams were originally split into six groups based on their conference, with one group containing six teams and five containing four teams. Each team will play three group stage matches, and the results will count toward the 2020 MLS regular season standings. However, following the withdrawal of FC Dallas and Nashville SC from the tournament, a revised structure for the group stage was announced on July 9, 2020. The tournament was split into six groups of four, with Chicago Fire FC moving from Group A to B.

Following the group stage, sixteen teams advanced to the knockout stage: the top two teams from each of the six groups and the four best third-placed teams. The knockout stage culminated in the tournament final on August 11. If a knockout match was tied at the end of regulation, a penalty shoot-out was used to determine the winner (no extra time was played).

During the tournament, teams were allowed to name a maximum of twelve substitutes, an increase from the MLS rule of seven. Additionally, teams were allowed to make up to five substitutions in a match, following a temporary amendment to the Laws of the Game by IFAB in order to lessen the impact of fixture congestion caused by the pandemic. However, each team was given only three opportunities to make substitutions, excluding those made at halftime.

The MLS is Back Tournament champions qualified for the 2021 CONCACAF Champions League. As a one-time change, this berth replaced the one normally awarded to the regular season conference champion that did not win the Supporters' Shield. The berth was awarded regardless of whether the champion was from the United States or Canada. Were the winners from Canada, they would still have participated in the 2020 Canadian Championship. The tournament also featured a $1.1 million prize pool for players to earn additional bonuses.

Following the tournament, the MLS regular season resumed with a revised schedule, which concluded with the playoffs and MLS Cup 2020. The MLS is Back tournament in itself became a contingency plan for the MLS in the event of a future pandemic or major disease outbreak.

Medical protocol
Major League Soccer announced a medical protocol, in consultation with experts, to be used for the tournament to ensure the health and safety of players, coaches, officials, and staff. This included testing for COVID-19 prior to and throughout the tournament, wearing a face covering or mask, and social distancing to prevent an outbreak of COVID-19 from occurring. Players and staff who were deemed "high-risk individuals" were not permitted to attend the tournament unless medically cleared. Had anyone tested positive for COVID-19, they were required to isolate under a strict and detailed protocol to prevent transmission.

Prior to travelling to Orlando, all players, coaches, referees, club personnel and league staff were required to complete two Polymerase Chain Reaction (PCR) tests 24 hours apart and 72 hours before travelling to the ESPN Wide World of Sports Complex. Upon arrival, all individuals were required to take another PCR test and are quarantined until the results of the tests arrive. All individuals who tested positive underwent a clinical assessment by a healthcare provider and moved to an isolation area of the hotel until they were medically cleared.

Major League Soccer started producing updates on the testing results of the PCR tests performed in Orlando on June 28. Up to that point, 329 individuals were tested for COVID-19, and two players tested positive, both of whom had just arrived at the facility. Within the next two days, 392 more individuals were tested, of which four of them tested positive. FC Dallas then provided an update on July 1 confirming that six of their players had tested positive for COVID-19, and the rest of their delegation had been quarantined in their hotel rooms pending the results of additional testing. From July 1 to 2, 855 individuals were tested, six of whom were tested positive for COVID-19, four of which were players. From July 3 to 4, two more players tested positive for COVID-19. Between July 7 and 8, Major League Soccer reported that four individuals tested positive for COVID-19, out of 1888 individuals tested.

On July 6, 2020, FC Dallas withdrew from the tournament due to ten players and one staff member of the club testing positive for COVID-19, after their opening match was initially postponed. On July 9, 2020, Nashville SC were also withdrawn from the tournament after nine players of the club tested positive for the virus, after their opening match was initially postponed.

On July 12, the match between Toronto FC and D.C. United was postponed just minutes prior to kickoff after at least one player was tested positive for COVID-19. The game was rescheduled for the following day on July 13, while the two players who received the positive and inconclusive test were both medically cleared to resume activities. Meanwhile, on July 14, Major League Soccer announced that there were no individuals who were tested positive out of the teams still participating in the tournament, while there was a single positive case out of the two teams that had withdrawn from the tournament. From July 16 onward, the MLS did not record a single positive test of COVID-19 within the delegation staying at the complex.

Schedule
The schedule of the competition was as follows. Up to three matches took place each day during the group stage, with kick-off times at 9a.m., 8p.m., and 10:30p.m. EDT (UTC−4) due to the Florida climate. Only one pair of matches overlapped during the tournament: Sporting Kansas City vs Colorado Rapids occurred simultaneously to D.C. United vs New England Revolution on adjacent fields on July 17, due to the latter match being rescheduled from an earlier date. The full match schedule for the tournament was announced on June 24, 2020.

Draw
The draw for the group stage took place on June 11, 2020, at 3:30p.m. EDT (UTC−4), hosted by Charlie Davies and Susannah Collins. The 26 teams were drawn into six groups based on their conference. To allow for an even number of teams in each group for the tournament, Nashville SC was moved from the Western Conference to the Eastern Conference for the remainder of the 2020 season. The fourteen teams of the Eastern Conference were drawn into one group of six teams (Group A) and two groups of four teams (Groups C and E). The twelve teams of the Western Conference were drawn into three groups of four teams (Group B, D, and F).

Three teams from each conference were seeded and drawn into separate groups. Orlando City SC was considered the "host" of the tournament and was therefore seeded and automatically assigned to Group A. The remaining five seeds were determined based on results from the 2019 season. Inter Miami CF was automatically assigned to Group A in order to face rival Florida club Orlando City SC in the opening match of the competition.

The seeded teams were drawn first and allocated to position 1 of the first available group. The unseeded teams were subsequently drawn, with the representatives of the six seeded teams, in rotation, choosing a numbered ball to occupy the next available position in their group until all the groups were completed. The draw resulted in the following groups:

Originally, the teams in Group A were scheduled to only face three out of the five teams within their group. However, after the group stage format was revised, all teams will face each other. The following were the initial pairings set prior to the draw:

On July 9, 2020, following the withdrawal of FC Dallas and Nashville SC, Major League Soccer announced that Chicago Fire FC would move from Group A to B, with Group A therefore becoming a four-team group. As a result, Chicago Fire was the only Eastern Conference team in an otherwise Western Conference group.

Group stage
The results of all the games in this stage were counted for points toward the 2020 regular season standings.

Tiebreakers
The ranking of teams in the group stage was determined as follows:

 Higher number of points obtained in all group matches;
 Higher number of wins in all group matches;
 Superior goal difference in all group matches;
 Higher number of goals scored in all group matches;
 Lower disciplinary points total in all group matches: 
 Coin toss (tie of two teams) or drawing of lots (tie of three or more teams).

Group A

Group B

Group C

Group D

Group E

Group F

Ranking of third-placed teams
The results of the third-placed teams from the six groups were compared against each other. The top four teams of this ranking advanced to the round of 16.

Knockout stage
In this stage, if a match was tied at the end of 90 minutes of normal playing time, a penalty shoot-out was used to determine the winners.

Bracket

Round of 16

Quarter-finals

Semi-finals

Final

Statistics

Top scorers

Top assists

Shutouts

Awards

Individual awards
The following awards were given at the conclusion of the tournament:

Player of the Tournament:  Sebastián Blanco (Portland Timbers)
Golden Boot:  Diego Rossi (Los Angeles FC)
Golden Glove:  Andre Blake (Philadelphia Union)
Young Player of the Tournament:  Diego Rossi (Los Angeles FC)
Goal of the Tournament:  Andy Polo (Portland Timbers)
Save of the Tournament:  Steve Clark (Portland Timbers)

The Golden Boot was given to the top scorer of the tournament. If multiple players had been level on goals scored, the first tiebreaker for the award would have been assists. Audi donated $10,000 to the academy of the winning player's club. The Player of the Tournament, Golden Glove, and Young Player of the Tournament were given out based on voting from the media (75%) and fans (25%). The Goal and Save of the Tournament were determined by the editorial team of MLSsoccer.com shortlisting eight candidates, with the final result chosen by online fan voting.

MLS is Back Tournament Best XI
The media chose the best eleven players of the tournament in a 4–3–3 formation.

Man of the Match
The Man of the Match was named after each match by the editorial team of MLSsoccer.com.

Team of the Week
The Team of the Week included the top players and coach during each week of the tournament, as chosen by the editorial team of MLSsoccer.com.

Goal of the Week
The Goal of the Week determines the best goal during each week of the tournament. The editorial team of MLSsoccer.com shortlists goals for fans to vote for on Twitter.

Media and broadcasting
All games in the tournament were produced by ESPN as host broadcaster, and were televised by Major League Soccer's media partners in the United States, Canada, and worldwide. Per health protocols, few ESPN staff members had on-field access, on-site production staff were divided into smaller groups, and all games were called remotely (with ESPN's games being called from the network's headquarters in Bristol). ESPN decided against using simulated crowd noise for its broadcasts, instead placing a focus on "enhanced" in-game audio via microphones embedded in the field (Fox Sports and Univision/TUDN stated that, by contrast, they would use artificial crowd noise, with Fox offering options for crowd audio on the online streams of its matches). ESPN employed 33 cameras each on the three fields, and also used drone cameras for aerial shots. A large chroma key wall was erected at each field in place of grandstands, which was used for displaying in-game sponsor logos. Jon Champion and Taylor Twellman served as ESPN's lead broadcast team for the tournament, while Adrian Healey and Alejandro Moreno and Steve Cangialosi and Shep Messing called select games, with Stefano Fusaro served as the on-site reporter for all the matches. Fox Sports had John Strong and Stuart Holden commentate on all of their matches, while Rob Stone, Alexi Lalas, and Maurice Edu hosted the pregame and postgame shows for select matches.

See also 
 2020 NBA Bubble, a similar concept for the National Basketball Association also held at the ESPN Wide World of Sports Complex

Notes

References

External links
 

2020 Major League Soccer season
Major League Soccer is Back Tournament
Major League Soccer is Back Tournament
2020 in sports in Florida
July 2020 sports events in the United States
August 2020 sports events in the United States
Soccer in Florida